The 1938 Chicago Bears season was their 19th regular season completed in the National Football League. They finished third in the Western Division and did not make the championship game. The Bears started the season well, winning 4 of their first 5 games. However, two upset losses to the Cleveland Rams, two losses to the Detroit Lions, and a loss to Green Bay prevented the Bears from competing in the West.

Season highlights
The Bears could not repeat their success of 1937. Although their attack was basically the same, except at running back. Bronko Nagurski and Keith Molesworth retired and the rushing attack was not as effective. Joe Maniaci, a back acquired from Brooklyn, joined the team and led the squad in rushing with 345 yards but his low 3.6 average yards per carry was emblematic of the Bears problems running the ball. Bill Karr again led the team in receiving, catching 14 passes for 253 yards and 4 touchdowns. Les McDonald played well at end and second year end Dick Plasman also contributed. The Bears "vertical" passing attack, led again by Bernie Masterson and Ray Buivid, had a league best 17.0 yards per reception, but the club's quarterbacks only had a 36.5 completion percentage. The Bear defense did not play as well as in 1937 either, giving up 14 or more points five times, or the same number of times as in the past two season combined. The biggest disappointment, overall, were the two losses to Cleveland. Cleveland only won 4 games all year, two against the Bears, and had the worst defense in the league, allowing 215 points for the year. In the first Cleveland game, the Bears were totally outplayed, falling behind 14–0 and failing to mount a serious comeback. The second loss was a back and forth affair, with the lead changing hands 7 times. The Bears gave up a 21–16 fourth quarter lead, losing 23–21 at home. As the only team in the league running the T-formation, it is no surprise the other teams kept using the Single Wing and its variants. Lacking a complete T-formation quarterback, the Bears offense was inconsistent and, at times, quite unimpressive.

Future Hall of Fame players
Dan Fortmann, guard
George Musso, guard
Joe Stydahar, tackle

Other leading players
Frank Bausch, center
Ray Buivid, back
Jack Manders, fullback/kicker
Joe Maniaci, back (acquired from Brooklyn at midseason)
Bernie Masterson, quarterback
Les McDonald, end
Ray Nolting, halfback

Players departed from 1937
Keith Molesworth, halfback (retired)
Bronko Nagurski, fullback (retired)

Schedule

Standings

Chicago Bears
Chicago Bears seasons
Chicago Bears